The Eau Claire Masonic Temple at the corner of South Barstow and Main Streets in Eau Claire, Wisconsin was built in 1899 and listed on the National Register of Historic Places in 2007. 

In 1927 the Masonic bodies that met there relocated to their recently completed Temple of Free Masonry on Graham Avenue.

It is a three-story brick building.  "The clearly visible pair of massive stone arches on the Barstow Street fa9ade and other decorative elements distinguish the Masonic Temple as a fine example of H.H. Richardson influenced [[Romanesque Revival
architecture]] and one of the most architecturally significant buildings in the downtown area."

References

Masonic buildings completed in 1899
Buildings and structures in Eau Claire, Wisconsin
Masonic buildings in Wisconsin
Clubhouses on the National Register of Historic Places in Wisconsin